Michael J. Novosel Sr. (September 3, 1922 – April 2, 2006) of Enterprise, Alabama served in the United States military during World War II, the Korean War, and the Vietnam War. He flew the B-29 Superfortress bomber in World War II. In order to serve in the Vietnam War, he gave up the rank of lieutenant colonel in the Air Force Reserve and became a chief warrant officer in the Army. He was awarded the Medal of Honor, the United States' highest military decoration, for his bravery in conducting a medical evacuation under fire in the Vietnam War. On October 11, 2022 it was announced that Fort Rucker, Alabama would be renamed Fort Novosel in his honor.

Biography
Novosel was born in Etna, Pennsylvania, the son of Croatian immigrants, and he grew up during the Great Depression. He joined the Army Air Corps at age 19, just ten months prior to Pearl Harbor, and he was a captain by 1945 flying B-29 Superfortress bombers in the war against Japan. He left the service for a brief time due to reductions in force after the war, and he settled in Fort Walton Beach, Florida to raise his family.

Novosel joined the Air Force Reserve and went back on active duty to serve his country during the Korean War. He left the service again in 1953 and was promoted to the rank of lieutenant colonel in the Air Force Reserve in 1955.

In 1963, Novosel was working as a commercial airline pilot when he decided to return to active military duty. By then, he was 41 and the Air Force did not have space for any more officers in the upper ranks. He made the decision to give up his rank of lieutenant colonel in the Air Force to join the Army and fly helicopters as a chief warrant officer (CW4) with the elite Special Forces Aviation Section. He served his first tour in Vietnam flying medevac helicopters (Dustoff) with the 283rd Medical Detachment. His second tour in Vietnam was with the 82nd Medical Detachment. During that war, Novosel flew 2,543 missions and extracted 5,589 wounded personnel, among them his own son Michael J. Novosel Jr. The following week, Michael Jr. returned the favor by extracting his father after he was shot down.

On the morning of October 2, 1969, Novosel set out to evacuate a group of South Vietnamese soldiers who were surrounded by several thousand North Vietnamese light infantry near the Cambodian border. Radio communication was lost and the soldiers had expended their ammunition. Without air cover or fire support, Novosel flew at low altitude under continuous enemy fire. He skimmed the ground with his helicopter while his medic and crew chief pulled the wounded men on board. He completed 15 hazardous extractions, was wounded in a barrage of enemy fire, and momentarily lost control of his helicopter, but when it was over, he had rescued 29 men. He completed his tour in March 1970.

Novosel retired as the senior warrant officer with the Warrant Officer Candidate Program in 1985. He had been a military aviator for 42 years and was the last World War II military aviator in the U.S. to remain on active flying duty. He accumulated 12,400 military flying hours, including 2,038 in combat. He remained active in the military community while residing in Enterprise, Alabama during his retirement, and he was frequently invited as an honored guest for military lectures and ceremonies throughout the nation. He co-piloted the liftoff of the Bell UH-1 Iroquois for the In the Shadow of the Blade mission in 2002. His book Dustoff – The Memoir of an Army Aviator was published in 1999.

Novosel was diagnosed with a recurrent cancer in November 2005, and he underwent a series of highly successful treatments at Walter Reed Army Medical Center in Washington, D.C. The cancer tumor was greatly reduced in December 2005 and January 2006. In February, he concluded chemotherapy and other treatments and waited to regain strength in preparation for surgery on March 7. His prognosis appeared excellent, yet he never fully recovered from the shock of the surgery. He died on April 2, 2006, and was buried at Arlington National Cemetery, in Arlington, Virginia.

Honors
In 1971, President Richard Nixon placed the Medal of Honor around Novosel's neck, the nation's highest award for valor in combat. Among his many other awards, he received the Distinguished Service Cross (which was later upgraded to the MOH), Distinguished Service Medal, Distinguished Flying Cross with two Oak Leaf Clusters, Bronze Star with Oak Leaf Cluster, and the Purple Heart. He was inducted into the Army Aviation Hall of Fame in 1975. Upon his retirement, he received a rare honor for a living hero when the main street at Fort Rucker, Alabama was renamed "Novosel Street." He also received the Distinguished Service Medal during his retiring ceremony.

On May 24, 2022, the Congressional Naming Commission recommended that Fort Rucker, AL be renamed to Fort Novosel, AL.  Final recommendations from the Congressional Naming Commission are due to congress on October 1, 2022.

Medal of Honor citation

See also

 List of Medal of Honor recipients for the Vietnam War

References

External links
 
 
 
 
 
 
 

1922 births
2006 deaths
United States Army Medal of Honor recipients
Vietnam War recipients of the Medal of Honor
United States Army Air Forces officers
United States Air Force officers
United States Army Air Forces bomber pilots of World War II
United States Army personnel of the Vietnam War
American Senior Army Aviators
Recipients of the Distinguished Service Cross (United States)
Recipients of the Distinguished Service Medal (US Army)
Recipients of the Distinguished Flying Cross (United States)
Recipients of the Air Medal
Recipients of the Gallantry Cross (Vietnam)
Burials at Arlington National Cemetery
Commercial aviators
American people of Croatian descent
Aviators from Pennsylvania
People from Fort Walton Beach, Florida
People from Etna, Pennsylvania
Military personnel from Pennsylvania